The Soundcity MVP Awards Festival ("TheMVPs" or "MVP") is an event presented by Soundcity TV which awards plaques to musicians and performers across Africa. Since 2007, the winners are chosen by the viewers and fans by visiting #TheMVPs' website and a select committee of the industry stakeholder. The first MVPs ceremony was held in December 2016 in Lagos, Nigeria.

The awards are presented annually and broadcast live on Soundcity TV on DStv, GOtv, TalkTalk UK, Soundcity Radio Network and Soundcity Android and iOS app as well as online on the SoundcityTV website, YouTube and other social media accounts.

The maiden ceremony (2016)

The MVPs award ceremony was announced by Soundcity TV when teaser radio and TV promo began to run in the first week of November on Soundcity Radio Network and Soundcity TV tagged 'Soundcity MVP Awards Festival' and announced as 'crowning the hardest working talents in Africa'. The maiden ceremony is to take place at the Expo Centre, Eko Hotel and Suites Lagos, Nigeria on the 29th of December, 2016 and hosted by comedian Basketmouth. Nominated artistes range from Wizkid with eight nominations including African artiste of the year, Davido, South Africa's Emtee, Nasty C, Mafikizolo to Ghana's Mz Vee, Sarkodie and Tanzania's Diamond Platnumz and Vanessa Mdee. The event would be broadcast live across Africa via cable TV, Soundcity Mobile App, Facebook and YouTube.

Since the maiden edition, Soundcity MVP Award Festival has witness different edition of the award.

References

African music awards